Physical literacy is a fundamental and valuable human capability that can be described as a disposition acquired by human individuals encompassing the motivation, confidence, physical competence, knowledge and understanding that establishes purposeful physical pursuits as an integral part of their lifestyle.

The fundamental and significant aspects of physical literacy  are:
 everyone can be physically literate as it is appropriate to each individual’s endowment
 everyone’s physical literacy journey is unique
 the skills that make up physical literacy can vary by location
 physical literacy is relevant and valuable at all stages and ages of life
 the concept embraces much more than physical competence
 at the heart of the concept is the motivation and commitment to be active
 the disposition is evidenced by a love of being active, born out of the pleasure and satisfaction individuals experience in participation
 a physically literate individual values and takes responsibility for maintaining purposeful physical pursuits throughout the lifecourse
 charting of progress of an individual’s personal journey must be judged against previous achievements and not against any form of national benchmarks

History 
In 1993, Dr. Margaret Whitehead proposed the concept of Physical literacy at the International Association of Physical Education and Sport for Girls and Women Congress in Melbourne, Australia. From this research, the concept and definition of physical literacy was developed. In addition, the implications of physical literacy being the goal of all structures were drawn up. Since 1993 to the present day, much has been done to advance physical literacy. Research has been conducted on Physical Literacy and presented at conferences around the world. In addition, the book Physical Literacy: throughout the life course was written and numerous conferences and workshops have been delivered, to train educators, parents, health practitioners, early childhood educators, coaches, and more.

General

The concept of physical literacy has been developed over many years. It is seen, by a growing number of people, as the goal of the school subject, physical education. However, whilst this is extremely relevant, it is important to recognise that physical literacy is not restricted to the school years – it is relevant throughout the lifecourse.  In this respect, six phases of physical literacy have been identified: infancy, childhood, adolescence, young adulthood, adulthood and older adulthood.

Over the past few years there has been considerable interest, worldwide, in the concept of physical literacy. In Great Britain, a number of local authorities have adopted it as an overall guiding principle for their work in school-based physical education. In countries such as Northern Ireland and Canada, physical literacy has been the focus for considerable rethinking in respect of children’s physical development and has consequently been the inspiration behind the development of new programmes. In India this principle has been adapted by Sportism for training the Indian kids on the basis of Physical literacy concepts.

However, there have been a number of interpretations of the concept that have moved away from the central tenets of physical literacy. For example, in some instances physical literacy has been the name given to a programme of fundamental movement skills, implying that the concept is solely about the acquisition of physical competence. Other interpretations have focused on knowledge and understanding, particularly in the games context. Both these scenarios include elements of physical literacy, but do not represent the whole story.

Attributes

A physically literate individual will display the following attributes:
 Physical literacy can be described as a disposition characterised by the motivation to capitalise on innate movement potential to make a significant contribution to the quality of life.
 All human beings exhibit this potential. However, its specific expression will depend on individuals’ endowment in respect of all capabilities, significantly their movement potential, and will be particular to the culture in which they live.
 Individuals who are physically literate will move with poise, economy and confidence in a wide variety of physically challenging situations
 Physically literate individuals will be perceptive in ‘reading’ all aspects of the physical environment, anticipating movement needs or possibilities and responding appropriately to these with intelligence and imagination
 These individuals will have a well-established sense of self as embodied in the world. This, together with an articulate interaction with the environment, will engender positive self-esteem and self-confidence
 Sensitivity to and awareness of embodied capability will lead to fluent self-expression through non-verbal communication and to perceptive and empathetic interaction with others
 In addition, physically literate individuals will have the ability to identify and articulate the essential qualities that influence the effectiveness of their own movement performance, and will have an understanding of the principles of embodied health with respect to basic aspects such as exercise, sleep and nutrition
 Physically literate individuals, in addition to having the ability of performing various physical skills, sports movements with ease and poise, will also have the ability to use the body and body segments while carrying out the daily activities like sitting, sleeping, mounting steps, getting down from height, carrying weights etc. so that there will be no negative impact on the body alignment and spinal posture.

Physical Literacy Worldwide

Canada
One element of Physical literacy is the mastering of basic human movements, fundamental movement skills and fundamental sport skills that permit a child to read their environment and make appropriate decisions, allowing them to move confidently and with control in a wide range of physical activity situations. Physical literacy is the foundation of long-term participation and performance to the best of one’s ability. Physical Literacy is the cornerstone of both participation and excellence in physical activity and sport. Ideally, physical literacy is developed prior to the adolescent growth spurt.

Fundamental Movement Skills and Fundamental Sport Skills

Fundamental movement skills play a significant role in a child’s physical development. When a child is confident and competent in these skills, children can develop sport-specific and complex movement skills as well as enjoy a long life of physical activity. To become physically literate children need to master the 13 fundamental movement skills:

The Locomotor and Body Skills:
 Walking
 Running
 Balance
 Skating/Skiing
 Jumping
 Swimming
 Cycling
 Skipping

The Sending Skills
 Throwing
 Kicking
 Striking

The Receiving Skills
 Catching
 Trapping

The daily activities
 Sitting
 Sleeping posture
 Lifting weights properly
 Getting down from heights
 Mounting steps etc.
These skills can be developed through the four following activities: athletics, gymnastics, swimming, and skating, slip, and slide movements. Each skill will involve a series of developmental stages that the child will go through in order to master that particular skill.
Fundamental Sport Skills involve using Fundamental Movement Skills in a sport specific setting (i.e. a child can kick a ball, this is a Fundamental Movement Skill; when she kicks a penalty kick in a soccer game, she has used this skill as a Fundamental Sport Skill, the skill of kicking a penalty kick). These skills should be introduced through fun and inclusive games and activities, providing children with positive physical activity experiences, further increasing their confidence, competence, and motivation to be active.

The Four Environments

To develop physical literacy children should learn fundamental movement skills and fundamental sport skills in each of the four basic environments:
 On the ground: as the basis for most games, sport, dance and physical activities
 In the water: as the basis for all aquatic activities
 On snow and ice: as the basis for all winter sliding activities
 In the air: basis for gymnastics, diving and other aerial activities

People with Disabilities

Everyone deserves the right to have opportunities to develop physical literacy. Although not all people with a disability will pursue physical activity or sport, they should still be provided with the same opportunities to learn fundamental movement skills, fundamental sport skills, and become active for life. There are both many opportunities and challenges that people with permanent disabilities experience in pursuing sport and physical activity. As a result, many resources have been created to support coaches, educators, recreation leaders, health practitioners, and parents in accommodating the needs of all participants to have increased physical activity and positive experiences.

References

External links
 www.physicalliteracy.ca
 www.physicalliteracy.org
 www.sportforlife.ca
 www.physical-literacy.org.uk
 
 

Physical education
Recreation
Exercise physiology
Literacy